Samuel Schemberg (23 July 1925 – July 2005) was a Brazilian water polo player. He competed in the men's tournament at the 1952 Summer Olympics.

References

1925 births
2005 deaths
Brazilian male water polo players
Olympic water polo players of Brazil
Water polo players at the 1952 Summer Olympics
Water polo players from Rio de Janeiro (city)
Medalists at the 1951 Pan American Games
Pan American Games silver medalists for Brazil
Pan American Games medalists in water polo
Water polo players at the 1951 Pan American Games
20th-century Brazilian people